K107 or K-107 may refer to:

K-107 (Kansas highway), a former state highway in Kansas
Piano Concertos K. 107 (Mozart)